Common Ground is the major label debut and first full-length studio album by the alternative rock band Rhythm Corps. The album reached No. 104 on the Billboard 200 albums chart on September 24, 1988.

Track listing 
All songs written by Rhythm Corps.

 "Father's Footsteps" - 4:34
 "I Surrender" - 4:12
 "Solidarity" - 5:23
 "Common Ground" - 4:05
 "Streets on Fire" - 5:32
 "Cold Wire" - 5:13
 "Giants" - 3:39
 "Faith and Muscle" - 3:55
 "Perfect Treason" - 4:42
 "Revolution Man" - 4:52

Single 
The title track was released as a single and reached No. 9 on the Album Rock Tracks chart in 1988. A music video for the song was also released.  The song's main guitar riff during the verses would be recycled eight years later by Hootie & the Blowfish on their song "Tucker's Town".

References 

Rhythm Corps albums
Pasha Records albums
Albums produced by Spencer Proffer
1988 albums